Johan Siebke (17 June 1781 – 14 August 1857) was a Norwegian botanical gardener.

Siebke grew up in Schleswig-Holstein. He  was a student and apprentice gardener at the University of Copenhagen Botanical Garden.  For the first four decades on it operation, he served as the  botanical gardener of the University of Oslo Botanical Garden  in the neighborhood of Tøyen in Oslo, Norway.

References

1781 births
1857 deaths
People from Schleswig-Holstein
German emigrants to Norway
19th-century Norwegian botanists